The Dickinson Rocks are isolated rock outcrops near the north end of Hershey Ridge,  northwest of Linwood Peak, in the Ford Ranges of Marie Byrd Land. They were mapped by the United States Antarctic Service (1939–41) and by the United States Geological Survey from surveys and U.S. Navy air photos (1959–65). They were named by the Advisory Committee on Antarctic Names for David N. Dickinson, a U.S. Navy construction mechanic at Brockton Station on the Ross Ice Shelf for two seasons, 1965–66 and 1966–67.

References 

Rock formations of Marie Byrd Land